The Evansville Purple Aces baseball team represents the University of Evansville, which is located in Evansville, Indiana. The Purple Aces are an NCAA Division I college baseball program that competes in the Missouri Valley Conference. They began competing in Division I in 1978 and joined the Missouri Valley Conference in the 1995  season. The Evansville Purple Aces play all home games on campus at Charles H. Braun Stadium.

Conference membership history
1951–1976: Indiana Collegiate Conference
1981–1994 Midwestern Collegiate Conference
1995–present Missouri Valley Conference

Charles H. Braun Stadium

Charles H. Braun Stadium is a baseball stadium on the Evansville campus in Evansville, Indiana that seats 1,200 people.

Head coaches
Records taken from the 2018 Evansville Purple Aces baseball media guide.

Awards and honors

All-Americans

Freshman First-Team All-Americans

Midwestern Collegiate Conference Player of the Year

Missouri Valley Conference Player of the Year

Midwestern Collegiate Conference Coach of the Year

Missouri Valley Conference Coach of the Year

Missouri Valley Conference Freshman of the Year

Taken from the 2018 Evansville Purple Aces baseball media guide. Updated March 11, 2020.

See also
List of NCAA Division I baseball programs

References